Bollullos Par del Condado is a town and municipality located in the province of Huelva, Spain. According to the 2005 census, it has a population of 13,335 inhabitants (266.7 inhabitants/km2 population density) and covers a 50 km2 area.

Demographics

References

External links
Bollullos Par del Condado - Sistema de Información Multiterritorial de Andalucía

Municipalities in the Province of Huelva